The Podolia Governorate or Podillia Governorate was an administrative unit (guberniya) of the Russian Empire from 1793 until 1925. Created from the Second Partition of Poland, the governorate was formed from the former Polish Bracław and Podole voivodeships, which are part of the Southwestern Krai along with Volhynia and Kiev. Its capital was located in Kamianets-Podilskyi, which later moved to Vinnytsia. The governorate still existed until the administrative reforms of the Ukrainian SSR, which dissolved it into five okruhas.

History

The Government of Podolia was established right after the Second Partition of Poland in place of the former Podole and Bracław Voivodeships in 1793.

Location
The Podolian Governorate occupied the southwestern frontier of the former Russian empire, bordering Austria-Hungary, and had an area of about 42,000 km2. The administrative centre was Kamenets-Podolskiy until 1914 when it moved to Vinnytsia.

Podolia Governorate was one of the three governorates of the Southwestern Krai administration. In 1917 it was recognized by the Russian Provisional Government to be governed by the General Secretariat of Ukraine as the representative of the Russian Provisional Government in the region.

Administrative division

Uyezd subdivision
Until 1918 the governorate consisted of 12 uyezds (counties):

Okruha subdivision

On 12 April 1923 all uyezds (counties) were transformed into okruhas (counties), while volosts (districts) – into raions (districts). Okruhas served as a subdivision of government until it was abolished on 1 August 1925. Together with the government of Podilia, the Haisyn okruha was dissolved as well. Some territory of Tulchyn okruha were included into the newly formed Moldavian Autonomous Soviet Socialist Republic.

 Vinnytsia
 Haisyn
 Kamianets
 Mohyliv
 Proskuriv
 Tulchyn

Principal cities
Russian Census of 1897:

 Kamenets/Podolsky – 35 934 (Jewish – 16 112, Ukrainian – 9 755, Russian – 7 420)
 Vinnitsa – 30 563 (Jewish – 11 456, Ukrainian – 10 862, Russian – 5 206)
 Balta – 23 363 (Jewish – 13 164, Russian – 5 385, Ukrainian – 4 124)
 Proskurov – 22 855 (Jewish – 11 369, Ukrainian – 4 425, Russian – 3 483)
 Mogilev/Dnestr – 22 315 (Jewish – 12 188, Ukrainian – 6 512, Russian – 2 668)
 Zhmerinka – 12 908
 Khmelnik – 11 657 (Jewish – 5 979, Ukrainian – 5 375, Polish – 150)

Smaller cities
 Bar – 9 982 (Jewish – 5 764, Ukrainian – 3 332, Russian – 485)
 Lityn – 9 420 (Jewish – 3 828, Ukrainian – 3 047, Russian – 2 126)
 Gaysin – 9 374 (Jewish – 4 322, Ukrainian – 3 946, Russian – 884)
 Olgopol – 8 134 (Ukrainian – 4 837, Jewish – 2 465, Russian – 625)
 Bratslav – 7 863 (Jewish – 3 275, Ukrainian – 2 608, Russian – 1 782)
 Letichev – 7 248 (Jewish – 4 105, Ukrainian – 1 719, Polish – 741)
 Yampol – 6 605 (Ukrainian – 3 282, Jewish – 2 819, Russian – 275)
 Novaya Ushytsa – 6 371 (Jewish – 2 214, Russian – 2 120, Ukrainian – 1 836)
 Staraya Ushytsa – 4 176 (Ukrainian – 2 488, Jewish – 1 584, Polish – 57)
 Salnitsa – 3 699 (Ukrainian – 2 758, Jewish – 899, Polish – 19)
 Verbovets – 2 311 (Ukrainian – 1 282, Jewish – 661, Polish – 326)

Language

The Imperial census of 1897 produced the following statistics. Bold type marks languages spoken by more people than the state language. In 1897 3,018,299 people lived in the governorate of Podolia.

Religious structures
 Churches
 Eastern Orthodox 1645
 Roman Catholic (kosciol) 202
 Lutheran 4
Monasteries
 Eastern Orthodox 7 (male), 4 (female)
Synagogues 89
 other Shul(s) 438
Mosque(s) 1

See also
Podolia

Notes

References

 
Governorates of the Russian Empire
Governorates of Ukraine
1790s establishments in the Russian Empire